A pastoral society is a social group of pastoralists, whose way of life is based on pastoralism, and is typically nomadic.  Daily life is centered upon the tending of herds or flocks.

Social organization
There is not an explicit form of the social organization associated with pastoralism. Pastoral societies are often organized in tribes, with the ‘household,' often incorporating the extended family, as a basic unit for organization of labor and expenses. Lineages are often the root for property rights. Mobility allows groups of pastoralists to leave and regroup as resources permit, or as sought after with changes in social relations.

Cross-border pastoralism
Sometimes pastoralists move their herds across international borders in search of new grazing or for trade. This cross-border activity can occasionally lead to tensions with national governments as this activity is often informal and beyond their control and regulation. In East Africa, for example, over 95% of cross-border trade is through unofficial channels and the unofficial trade of live cattle, camels, sheep and goats from Ethiopia sold to Somalia, Kenya and Djibouti generates an estimated total value of between US$250 and US$300 million annually (100 times more than the official figure). This trade helps lower food prices, increase food security, relieve border tensions and promote regional integration. However, there are also risks as the unregulated and undocumented nature of this trade runs risks, such as allow disease to spread more easily across national borders. Furthermore, governments are unhappy with lost tax revenue and foreign exchange revenues.

There have been initiatives seeking to promote cross-border trade and also document it, in order to both stimulate regional growth and food security, but also allow the effective vaccination of livestock. Initiatives include Regional Resilience Enhancement  Against Drought (RREAD), the Enhanced Livelihoods in Mandera Triangle/Enhanced Livelihoods in Southern Ethiopia (ELMT/ELSE) as part of the Regional Enhanced Livelihoods in Pastoral Areas (RELPA) programme in East Africa, and the Regional Livelihoods Advocacy Project (REGLAP) funded by the European Commission Humanitarian Aid Office (ECHAO).

Examples of pastoral societies

Traditional

North & Northeast Africa
 Afar of the Horn of Africa
 Bedouin of West Africa and the Arabian Peninsula
 Beja of North Africa and the Horn of Africa
 Oromos of the Horn of Africa
 Rendille of the Horn of Africa
 Saho of the Horn of Africa
 Somalis of the Horn of Africa
 Tigre of the Horn of Africa
 Tuareg of the north-central Sahara
 Northern Songhai camel herders of Central Sahara

Sahel
 Fula people of Sahelian West Africa
 Toubou of Niger and Chad

Sub-Saharan Africa
 Karimojong of Uganda
 Maasai of East Africa
 Pokot of East Africa
 Samburu of East Africa
 Turkana of East Africa
 Zulu people of South Africa

Near East
 Kuchis of Afghanistan
 Yörük of Turkey

South Asia
 Ahir found throughout North India
 Bakarwal found in Jammu and Kashmir
 Bharwad in bengal
 Bhutia in north India and Nepal
 Bodla found in Pakistani Punjab
 Charan in Gir(Gujarat)
 Chishti found in Pakistani Punjab
 Dhangar found in Maharashtra, MP
 Gaddi of Himachal Pradesh
 Maldhari of Gujarat
 Muslim Gaddi
 Gaderia in UP and MP
 Ghosi
 Gurjar found in North India, Afghanistan and Pakistan
 Kuruba found in South India
 Kurma found in South India
 Rabari of Gujarat, Rajasthan and panjab
 Ranghar found in North India and Pakistan
 Sherpa in Nepal
 Wattu found in Pakistani Punjab
 Raika found in Rajasthan

Central Asia
 Tuvans of Mongolia

Southern Europe
 Aromanians of Balkans
 Sarakatsani of Greece
 Vaqueiros de alzada of Spain

Northern Europe
 Komi of northern Russia
 Proto-Indo-Europeans of Pontic–Caspian steppe
 Sami of Scandinavia

North America
 Navajo of North America

South America
 Quechua of The Andes region
 Aymara of The Andes and Altiplano regions

Modern
One of the consequences of the break-up of the Soviet Union and the subsequent political independence and economic collapse of its Central Asian republics is the resurgence of pastoral nomadism. Taking the Kyrgyz people as a representative example, nomadism was the centre of their economy prior to Russian colonization at the turn of the C19/C20, when they were settled into agricultural villages. The population became increasingly urbanized after World War II, but some people continued to take their herds of horses and cows to the high pasture (jailoo) every summer. Since the 1990s, as the cash economy shrank, unemployed relatives were absorbed back on the family farm, and the importance of this form of nomadism has increased. The symbols of nomadism, specifically the crown of the grey felt tent known as the yurt, appears on the national flag, emphasizing the centrality of their nomadic history and past in the creation of the modern nation of Kyrgyzstan.

See also 
 Hunter-gatherer society
 Agrarian society

References

External links 

 Pastoral societies – (includes pictures)

Subcultures